Gopalan Nair Shankar, popularly known as G. Shankar, is an architect from Kerala, India. He advocates the use of locally available materials, sustainability, eco-friendliness and cost effectiveness. He did his architecture studies (B.Arch) from College of Engineering, Trivandrum (1982 batch) and later did M.S. from Birmingham School of Architecture, UK and postgraduate diploma in journalism. He has also won 3 national awards for green architecture, slum resettlement  and eco city design.. His attitude to "green architecture" has gained him a reputation as the "people's architect". Shankar was awarded the Padma Shri by the Government of India in 2011.

References

External links 
 
 
 

1960 births
Living people
Recipients of the Padma Shri in science & engineering
Businesspeople from Thiruvananthapuram
20th-century Indian architects
Artists from Thiruvananthapuram